= Kim Crabbe =

American soccer player

Kim Crabbe is an American former soccer player who played as a striker.

== Early life ==
Crabbe was born in the United States. She grew up in Reston, United States.

== Education ==
Crabbe attended George Mason University in the United States. She helped the soccer team win the league.

== Career ==
Crabbe was called up to represent the United States internationally. She became the first Black woman to be called up to the United States women's national soccer team.

== Style of play ==
Crabbe mainly operated as a striker. She was known for her speed.

== Personal life ==
Crabbe has lived in Wilmington, North Carolina, United States. She has worked as a youth manager.
